Rise of the Hero is the eighth studio album by German heavy metal band Iron Savior which was released on 28 February 2014 via AFM Records. It was recorded, mixed and mastered at Powerhouse Studio in Hamburg from June - December 2013 with the drums being recorded at Rekorder Studio in November 2013.

A music video was made for "Burning Heart".

Track listing

Album information
When giving all the insight on the album, Piet Sielck gave a brief explanation as needed:

"As usual, the new album was recorded and produced in my own Powerhouse Studio. So, what can be expected? A full dose of first-class, heavy music; power metal to the max! We’ve got one really big surprise for you all though, and so far, it’s just been known as 'The Surprise Track'….. We recently did a cover version of Mando Diao’s “Dance With Somebody” and, whatever works is allowed, right? Originally it was recorded only as a bonus track for the limited edition, but we simply liked it so much that we finally decided to make it a regular album track….."

Credits
Piet Sielck – vocals, guitars
Joachim "Piesel" Küstner – guitars, backing vocals, additional lead vocals on "I've Been to Hell 2014" and "Mind Over Matter 2014"
Jan-Sören Eckert – bass, backing vocals
Thomas Nack – drums, backing vocals

Production
Felipe Machado Franco – cover art, artwork, design
Piet Sielck – producer, engineering, mixing, mastering
Jan Rubach – engineering (drums)
Anabell Ganske – photography

References

Iron Savior albums
2014 albums
AFM Records albums